Ceratocephala may refer to :
 Ceratocephala (plant), a plant genus in the family Ranunculaceae
 Ceratocephala (trilobite), an animal genus in the family Odontopleuridae

See also 
 Ceratocephale, a polychaete worm genus in the family Nereididae